Staffordshire Terrier may refer to:

 American Staffordshire Terrier, a medium-sized, short-coated American dog breed, part of pit bull group
 Staffordshire Bull Terrier, a medium-sized, short-coated English dog breed, commonly called Stafford, that originated in the Black Country of Staffordshire in the English Midlands.

See also 
 Terrier (disambiguation)